Illukpelessa may refer to:

 Illukpelessa (7°1'N 80°54'E), a village in Sri Lanka
 Illukpelessa (7°7'N 80°49'E), a village in Sri Lanka